Apostibes afghana is a moth of the family Scythrididae. It was described by Pietro Passerin d'Entrèves and Angela Roggero in 2003. It is found in north-eastern Afghanistan.

The length of the forewings is 12-13.5 mm. The forewings are whitish, slightly striped by light brown. The hindwings are white with a metallic hue, and a darker fringe.

Etymology
The species name is derived from Afghanistan, where it was collected.

References

Scythrididae
Moths described in 2003
Moths of Asia